Rosscote Krishna Pillai (26 June 1927 – 20 October 2020), was an Indian science writer and a news reader with All India Radio from Kerala.

Early life
Rosscote Krishna Pillai was born on June 26, 1927 in Thiruvananthapuram, then part of the kingdom of Travancore, with a rich lineage of which he could boast. His father Padinjarekotta Punnaykkal Veettil Ayyappan Pillai Raman Pillai popularly known as A.R. Pillai was an Indian expatriate who worked for India's freedom in Germany, journalist, writer and a book publisher in Göttingen in Germany. His mother, B. Gouri Amma, was the eldest daughter of C. V. Raman Pillai, one of the greatest Malayalam novelists, being the first historical novelist in Malayalam and the author of Marthanda Varma, Dharmaraja, Premamritham, and Ramarajabahadur, pioneering dramatist, journalist and social activist. Born R Krishna Pillai, he took the name 'Rosscote' after the house built by C. V. and named after C.V.'s guru, John Ross, a Scotsman and the first principal of His Highness The Maharaja's College – now called the University College – in Thiruvananthapuram). After completing his school, he joined H. H. Maharaja's College and secured his M.Sc. Degree in Chemistry.

Career
Pillai entered the Indian Information Service and served in various media units under the Ministry of Information and Broadcasting, Government of India. He was then sent on deputation as News Editor in the Regional Language Division of All India Radio Delhi where he was assigned the Malayalam News Bulletin.
He was the founding editor of the Malayalam edition of Yojana, a publication under Publication Division of Government of India, which until then was available in English and  
Hindi only. He also served as Information Officer in the Press Information Bureau and as a member of the Executive Committee of the Kerala Sahitya Akademi.

Contributions to literature
The scientific articles written on the project received much attention. Accurate Malayalam translations of many scientific terminologies were presented in the English-Malayalam Science Dictionary compiled by him. His major works include An Illustrated Encyclopedia for Children, Dictionary of C.V. Raman Pillai's works, A Collection of Essays on Lunar Mission, and a Malayalam scientific dictionary, A Book on Birdwatching, Wadamalli: Scientific Scripts and 'Discoveries that Changed the Face of the World' (translation).
Rosscote Krishna Pillai was instrumental in establishing the C.V. Raman Pillai Memorial Foundation.

Honours
He was the recipient of a Harvard University fellowship.

References

1927 births
2020 deaths
Indian journalists
Indian scientists